Ludwigia palustris is a species of flowering plant in the evening primrose family known by the common names marsh seedbox, Hampshire-purslane and water purslane.  This is an aquatic or semiaquatic perennial herb which grows in moist to wet to flooded areas. It is sometimes a weed. The species epithet palustris is Latin for "of the marsh" and indicates its common habitat.

Description
The stem is up to half a meter (20 in) long and spreads to form mats on the mud, rooting at nodes in contact with the substrate, or floats ascending in the water. The leaves are oppositely arranged and green to red or purple in color. Solitary flowers appear in leaf axils. They are made up of tiny green sepals and no petals. They yield small capsular fruits containing many minute seeds.

Distribution
Its native distribution is unclear, but includes parts of the Americas; it can be found on most continents and spreads easily to become naturalized. It is also cultivated as an aquarium plant. It was identified in England in 1827.

References

External links
Jepson Manual Treatment
Missouri Plants Photo Profile
Illinois Wildflowers
VT Weed Identification
Photo gallery

palustris
Aquatic plants